Caroline Ann Austin is a British molecular biologist known for her work on human DNA topoisomerase enzymes. She is a Professor of Molecular Biology at the Institute for Cell and Molecular Biosciences at Newcastle University Medical School.

Education and career

Caroline gained her first degree in biochemistry from Chelsea College, University of London. Her PhD is from University College London, studying cytochrome P450s. She carried out postdoctoral research at Harvard University and at St George's, University of London. In 1993, she joined Newcastle University, initially as a lecturer in biochemistry and genetics, and has been a professor there since 2005.

She served on the British Society for Cell Biology committee (2011–17) and has been a council member of the Royal Society of Biology since 2017. She was on the Medical Research Council non-clinical career development panel (2013–17).

Research
Caroline's published research focuses on human DNA topoisomerase II and anti-cancer agents that target these enzymes; a particular recent interest is investigating secondary, therapy-related leukemias associated with topoisomerase II.  She was a co-discoverer of DNA topoisomerase IIbeta (TOP2B). Her most-cited article, Caroline Magaret Austin, KL Marsh. "Eukaryotic DNA topoisomerase IIβ" in BioEssays 20 (3), 215–226 (1998) has been cited 274 times, according to Google Scholar.

References

External links
Google Scholar report

Year of birth missing (living people)
Living people
British molecular biologists
Academics of Newcastle University